Badhi Mazra is a village situated in the Gangoh Mandal  of Saharanpur District in Uttar Pradesh . It is situated about 3.288 km far from the Mandal headquarters at Gangoh, and is 488 km distance from the state capital Lucknow. A significant proportion of the population belongs to the gurjar community.

Villages nearby include Salarpura (1.5 km), Budhanpur (1.7 km), Kamhera (2.4 km), Khanpur Gujar (2.7 km), Budha Khera (3.1 km)  and Sukheri (3.2 km).

References 

Villages in Saharanpur district